The Cloudmaker (Mountain) is a massive mountain,  high, standing at the west side of Beardmore Glacier, just south of Hewson Glacier. Easily identifiable by its high, ice-free slope facing Beardmore Glacier, it was discovered by the British Antarctic Expedition, 1907–09, and so named because of a cloud which usually appeared near the summit, providing a useful landmark during their journey up the Beardmore Glacier.

References
 

Mountains of the Ross Dependency
Dufek Coast